Garrett M. Graff (born 1981) is an American journalist and author. He is a former editor of Politico Magazine, editor-in-chief of Washingtonian magazine in Washington, D.C., and instructor at Georgetown University in the Masters in Professional Studies Journalism and Public Relations program.

Life
Graff was born in 1981 and raised in Montpelier, Vermont. As an undergraduate at Harvard College, Graff was an editor of The Harvard Crimson. He also held internships at ABC News' Political Unit and Atlantic Monthly.  He served as deputy national press secretary on Howard Dean's presidential campaign; he helped create and maintain Dean's website.

He later took a job as the Vice President of Communications at EchoDitto, Inc. a Washington, D.C.-based technology consulting firm. Graff also ran FishbowlDC for the blog Media Bistro. In 2005, Graff became the first blogger to receive credentials to cover the White House.

Graff and Katherine Frances Birrow were married in Barnard, Vermont in 2013.

Works

References

External links
Official website

American bloggers
The Harvard Crimson people
Georgetown University faculty
Living people
21st-century American non-fiction writers
1981 births